Pontang is a district in the Banten province on the island of Java, Indonesia.

Location

The Ciujung, a river, enters the sea at Pontang.
The Ciujung discharges into the  Banten Bay.

Historical

Pontang port and the Ciujung river used to be important for carrying merchandise into the interior.
Tomé Pires, who wrote of the region around 1515, said Pontang was one of the busy and crowded ports of the Sunda kingdom.
The harbor was smaller than that of Banten, but the only one where large ships could anchor.
The city was beautiful, with the harbor at the river bank near the sea shore.
Rice, pepper and food were sold.
To guard against Muslim influence the king banned trade with Muslim merchants from Java.

By the end of the 17th century the "sultan's canals" had been built for the purpose of irrigation between Markasana and Kanari, and between Pontang, Tanara and Bensung.
Presumably some rice fields were irrigated in the mid-18th century.
However, until the 20th century sawah that depended on rain covered 2.5 times more land than irrigated sawah in the coastal region.

In 1813 Java was under British control and the land was being leased rather than subject to forced deliveries and contingents as it had been under the Dutch.
Major Udney Yule, the British resident, was instructed by Stamford Raffles to grant equitable and moderate leases to the renter class.
All the half-yearly rents in the Bantam Residency due on 1 July 1813 were paid on time apart from those due from Pontang, Tanara, Tambakbaya and Trate(?). 
In this area a drought had caused the rice crop to fail entirely.

Villages

As of 2010 the district was divided into the following villages:

Notes

Sources

Districts of Banten